"Anyone Else but You" is a song by the indie rock band The Moldy Peaches. The song became popular after being featured on the soundtrack of the 2007 film Juno, as it was used extensively in the film, along with several other songs by Kimya Dawson that she wrote for her toddler. A version is also performed by the two main characters (Elliot Page and Michael Cera) at the end of the film. The Page and Cera version of the song was a minor chart success in the United States, reaching #91 on the Billboard Hot 100 in January 2008.

The song lyrics "up up down down left right left right B A start" refer to the Konami Code, a commonly used sequence to enable cheat codes in video games.

In popular culture
This song is in the documentary Murderball.
A spoof of the song was performed in Disaster Movie by Crista Flanagan. 
In the 30 Rock episode Secret Santa, Liz Lemon sings a parody of the song as a Christmas gift for Jack Donaghy.

References

The Moldy Peaches songs
2001 songs
Sanctuary Records singles